Kathy Brown (born July 12, 1960) is an American dance and house singer from South Carolina. Her credits include vocals on the songs "Turn Me Out (Turn to Sugar)" and "Strings of Life (Stronger on My Own)".

Career 
Brown began singing in her local gospel choir. After joining the contemporary R&B group Sweet Cinnamon. Kathy met with New York-based producer David Shaw through a mutual friend. This collaboration led to her first single, "Can't Play Around", released in 1993 which was a number thirteen hit on the US Billboard Hot Dance Music/Club Play chart.

Brown scored number one success as the lead singer of Praxis, a musical project assembled by producers Cevin Fisher and David Shaw. Praxis's "Turn Me Out", first released in 1994, has been remixed and re-released  several times since, with two subsequent US Billboard Hot Dance Music/Club Play chart entries, including 1997's "Turn Me Out (Turn To Sugar)", which hit number one. "Turn Me Out" returned to the dance chart in 2003 with new remixes, this time climbing to #42. Brown collaborated with David Morales on 1999's "Joy" which climbed to number four on the Hot Dance Music/Club Play chart.

In 2004, Brown was the lead vocalist on British act Soul Central's "Strings of Life (Stronger on My Own)" which reached number six on the UK Singles Chart and number one on the UK Dance Chart. The single was also a hit in Europe, reaching number twenty-eight on the Eurochart. "Strings of Life" samples  Is 's 1989 house classic of the same name.

Brown's vocals animate other cuts such as "Voodoo Magic" and "Time & Time Again" with the Major Boys. Brown's rendition of "You Give Good Love" reached the Top 10 of the UK Dance Chart in August 2002. In the spring 2006 she recorded "Get Another Love", released on Defected Records. The track went on to score in the Top 10 of the BBC Radio 1 Dance Chart.

In 2008, Brown and dance outfit White Knights released "Sound of the City". The single, written by Jason Gardiner and Nick Tcherniak about Soho, London, peaked at number six on the UK Upfront Club chart.

In the fall of 2010, Brown reconnected with producer David Shaw and partner Deep Influence to produce two tracks; "Feel the Music" and "Love and Pain" on the duo's digitally distributed Kontinuous Music.

Discography

Singles

See also 
List of number-one dance hits (United States)
List of artists who reached number one on the U.S. dance chart

References

External links 
Booking agency of Kathy Brown

1960 births
Living people
American house musicians
American soul singers
Singers from South Carolina
American women in electronic music
21st-century American women singers
21st-century American singers